La cambiale di matrimonio (English: The Bill of Marriage or The Marriage Contract) is a one-act operatic farsa comica by Gioachino Rossini to a libretto by Gaetano Rossi. The libretto was based on the play by Camillo Federici (1791) and a previous libretto by Giuseppe Checcherini for Carlo Coccia's 1807 opera, Il matrimonio per lettera di cambio. The opera debuted on 3 November 1810 at the Teatro San Moisè in Venice. It had a run of thirteen performances at Teatro San Moisè.

Composed in a few days when he was 18 years old, La cambiale di matrimonio was Rossini's first professional opera. The overture, written when he was a student at the Liceo Musicale in Bologna, is an important part of the modern concert repertoire.  As was to become typical of his later career, the duet "Dunque io son" was later reused, to greater effect, in act 1 of The Barber of Seville.

Roles

Synopsis
Place: London, the chambers of Tobias Mill
 18th Century

The servants Norton and Clarina discuss a letter which has arrived for their master, Tobias Mill, regarding an impending marriage contract from a Canadian businessman, Slook, who is due to arrive later that day. Mill enters, flustered from calculating the distance from the Americas to Europe, and orders the household to prepare for Slook's arrival, including the readying of his daughter, Fanny, whom he intends to marry off to the foreigner. After everyone leaves, Fanny arrives with her lover, Eduardo Milfort; their love has been kept a secret from Mill due to Eduardo's poor financial status. Norton enters and informs the lovers of the impending marriage contract, but their conversation is interrupted by Mill's entrance as the carriage arrives bearing the Canadian.

Slook enters harassed by the servants who are trying to take his coat: he is clearly unaccustomed to European greetings. Mill encourages Slook to talk to Fanny and to get to know her, but she remains quite hostile, trying to express her disinterest in marrying him with many "but's". However, she is soon joined by Eduardo, and they both threaten to cut out Slook's eyes and puncture his veins. Slook departs to the safety of his room, Fanny and Eduardo to other quarters, as Clarina and Norton return. Before Slook comes back, Clarina expresses her experiences with love and, then upon his return, Norton informs him that the goods he is interested in acquiring are already mortgaged.

Infuriated by this contractual double-crossing, Slook refuses to buy Fanny and tells Mill this. However, he refuses to give a reason fearing retribution from the lovers. Mill then threatens Slook with the prospect of a duel for refusing to carry through with the contract he has incurred. Having encountered three people who wish him dead within hours of his arrival in London, Slook prepares to leave and, when he returns from packing his belongings, he sees Fanny and Eduardo embracing,  catching them red-handed, but they tell him about Mill's business-managerial sentiments toward marriage and of Eduardo's poor financial status; Slook responds by promising to make Eduardo his heir so that Fanny may be his.

Mill returns and prepares for his duel, although he fears that, if he dies, it may reflect poorly upon his reputation in the market. Slook reveals himself and clandestinely replaces a pistol with a peace pipe which Mill grabs, not realizing what it is. As they head to the field of battle (Slook armed with a pistol, Mill with a pipe), the ensemble rushes in and tries to convince Mill to give up the financial pretensions. Finally Slook convinces Mill to allow the couple to marry and all ends   happily.

Recordings

Selected Performances

See also
List of operas by Rossini

References
Notes

Sources
Gossett, Philip; Brauner, Patricia (2001), "La cambiale di matrimonio" in Holden, Amanda (ed.), The New Penguin Opera Guide, New York: Penguin Putnam. 
Kennedy, Michael (2007), "La cambiale di matrimonio", The Concise Oxford Dictionary of Music. (By subscription:Oxford Reference Online). Oxford University Press. Retrieved 8 December 2013)
Osborne, Charles (1994), The Bel Canto Operas of Rossini, Donizetti, and Bellini, Portland, Oregon: Amadeus Press. 
Osborne, Richard (1998), "La cambiale", in Stanley Sadie (Ed.), The New Grove Dictionary of Opera, Vol. One. London: Macmillan Publishers, Inc.   
Osborne, Richard (2008), "La Cambiale di matrimonio"], Grove Music Online by subscription only.   
Warrack, John and West, Ewan (1996), The Oxford Dictionary of Opera'' New York: OUP.

External links
Libretto, Deutsche Rossini Gesellschaft. Accessed 23 March 2008.

Operas
Farse
1810 operas
Operas by Gioachino Rossini
Italian-language operas
One-act operas
Libretti by Gaetano Rossi